The 2010–11 Robert Morris Colonials men's basketball team represented Robert Morris University in the 2010–2011 NCAA Division I basketball season. Robert Morris was coached by Andrew Toole and played their home games at the Charles L. Sewall Center in Moon Township, PA. They finished with a record of 18–13 and 12–6 in NEC play.

Coaching staff

Roster

Schedule 

|-
!colspan=9| Exhibition

|-
!colspan=9| Regular season

References

Robert Morris Colonials men's basketball seasons
Robert Morris
Robert
Robert